Eolomea is a 1972 science fiction film directed by Herrmann Zschoche, based on the book of the same name by Angel Wagenstein. The film was an East German/Soviet/Bulgarian coproduction.

Story
Eight spaceships disappear and radio contact to the enormous space station "Margot" is broken off. Professor Maria Scholl and the high council decree a flight ban for all other spaceships. Nevertheless, one ship succeeds in leaving earth. The cause of all these strange events is the mysterious signals in Morse code coming to earth from the constellation Cygnus. Deciphered, they say the word "Eolomea," which seems to refer to a planet. With Captain Daniel Lagny, an unmotivated eccentric, Maria Scholl undertakes the risky journey to the space station "Margot" to uncover the secret, only to discover that a secretly planned expedition of stolen spaceships is leaving for Eolomea against the will of the government.

Cast
 Cox Habbema: Prof. Maria Scholl
 Ivan Andonov: Daniel Lagny
 Rolf Hoppe: Prof. Oli Tal
 Vsevolod Sanayev: Kun, the pilot
 Peter Slabakov: Pierre Brodski
 Wolfgang Greese: Chairman
 Holger Mahlich: Navigator
 Benjamin Besson: Capt. Sima Kun
 Evelyn Opoczynski: colleague of Scholl
 Heidemarie Schneider: colleague of Sima Kun

Editions
The original, uncut version of the film was rereleased by the DEFA Film Library at the University of Massachusetts Amherst in 2005.

References

Bibliography
Fritzsche, Sonja. "A Natural and Artificial Homeland: East German Science-Fiction Film Responds to Kubrick and Tarkovsky." Film & History (03603695) 40.2 (2010): 80-101.
Kruschel, Karsten: "Leim für die Venus. Der Science-Fiction-Film in der DDR." Das Science Fiction Jahr 2007 ed. Sascha Mamczak and Wolfgang Jeschke. Heyne Verlag, 2007: 803–888. .
Lessard, John. "Iron Curtain Auteurs." Cineaste 34.3 (2009): 5-11.
Stott, Rosemary. "Continuity and Change in GDR Cinema Programming Policy 1979–1989: the Case of the American Science Fiction Import." German Life & Letters 55.1 (2002): 91.

External links

1972 films
1970s science fiction films
German science fiction films
Soviet science fiction films
East German films
1970s German-language films
Bulgarian science fiction films
1970s German films